Thompson, also known as Thompson Station, is an unincorporated community in Bullock County, Alabama, United States.

History
Thompson was incorporated on September 8, 1883, and its charter was repealed in July 1919. A post office was operated in Thompson from 1878 to 1954.

Demographics

References

Unincorporated communities in Bullock County, Alabama
Unincorporated communities in Alabama